James Harvey Bloom (28 December 1860 – 1944) was an English clergyman and antiquary.

Bloom was the son of Rev. James Graver Bloom. A non-collegiate student at the University of Cambridge, he gained his B.A. in 1887 and a M.A. in 1891. Ordained deacon in Calcutta in 1888, he was curate of St Andrew's, Hertford. After becoming a priest in 1890, he was curate of Hemsworth from 1890 to 1892. He was Headmaster of Long Marston Grammar School from 1893 to 1895, and then Rector of Whitchurch, Warwickshire from 1896 to 1917.

Bloom was a genealogist, antiquarian and miscellaneous author.

Bloom died in 1944. His books were sold at auction.

His daughter was the novelist Ursula Bloom, who published a memoir of her father, Parson Extraordinary (1963).

Works
Shakespeare's Church, otherwise the Collegiate Church of the Holy Trinity of Stratford-upon-Avon: an architectural and ecclesiastical history of the fabric and its ornaments, 1902
Shakespeare's Garden: being a compendium of quotations and references from the bard to all manner of flower, tree, bush, vine, and herb, arranged according to the month in which they are seen to flourish, 1903
English Seals, 1906
English Tracts, Pamphlets and Printed Sheets: a bibliography, 1923
Folk Lore, Old Customs, and Superstitions in Shakespeare Land, 1929
Medical Practitioners in the Diocese of London, Licensed under the Act of 3 Henry VIII, c. 11: an annotated list, 1529–1725, 1935

References

External links
 

1860 births
1944 deaths
Alumni of Fitzwilliam College, Cambridge
19th-century English Anglican priests
20th-century English Anglican priests
English antiquarians